The following are the national records in track cycling in Venezuela maintained by the Venezuelan Cycling Federation (Federacion Venezolana De Ciclismo).

Men

Women

References

External links
 FVCi web site

Venezuela
records
Track cycling
track cycling